The Charles Eliot Memorial is a memorial commemorating landscape architect Charles Eliot, installed along Boston's Charles River Esplanade, in the U.S. state of Massachusetts.

External links
 
 Charles Eliot Memorial, Charles River Eslpanade – Boston, MA at Waymarking
 BOSTON'S CHARLES RIVER ESPLANADE: AN URBAN JEWEL at Landscape Notes

Charles River Esplanade
Monuments and memorials in Boston
Outdoor sculptures in Boston